Matt Swick (born 1 September 1978) is a Canadian former rower. He competed in the men's eight event at the 2000 Summer Olympics.

References

External links
 

1978 births
Living people
Canadian male rowers
Olympic rowers of Canada
Rowers at the 2000 Summer Olympics
Rowers from St. Catharines
World Rowing Championships medalists for Canada